SD Raiders, is a semi-professional soccer club, based and located in the Moorebank area of New South Wales.
In season 2019, they played in the New South Wales National Premier Leagues 3 competition.
In current season 2020, they competed in the New South Wales National Premier Leagues 2 competition.

The club is the representative team of the Southern Districts Soccer Football Association (SDSFA).

Senior Team History 
In 2012, SDSFA entered a joint Venture with State League side Fairfield Bulls to form Southern Bulls, competing in State League One.

In 2014 the partnership fell apart with SD Raiders taking over the name in 2016.

The Technical Director for the club is former Socceroo and Sydney FC player Nick Carle.

In 2015, as Southern Bulls, they finished third yet won through to the grand final where they defeated Dunbar Rovers 2–0.

In 2016, they again finished third however, as winners of the Club Championship (now playing as SD Raiders), won promotion to the NPL NSW 3.

In 2018 SD Raiders qualified for the grand final, losing 2-0 to St George City. 

The following year they finished second in the competition and again played in the grand final, this time winning 3-1 over premiers, Stanmore Hawks. Additionally, as the winners of the Club Championship, they achieved promotion to the NPL2 competition for season 2020.

Honours

NSW State League 2
Champions (1): 2015

NSW State League
Club Champions (1): 2016

National Premier Leagues NSW 3
Champions (1): 2019

National Premier Leagues NSW 3
Club Champions (1): 2019

Notes and references

External links 
 SD Raiders Website
 State League Competition Website

Soccer clubs in New South Wales